The Best American Short Stories 2019 is a volume in the annual Best American Short Stories anthology. It was edited by the series editor, Heidi Pitlor, and guest editor and Pulitzer Prize winner, Anthony Doerr.

Short stories included

Reception
In a review of The Best American Short Stories 2019 in the New York Journal of Books, Anjanette Delgado stated that the collection's stories are "unabashedly political, aware of their context, of the times we live, and understand their role in this particular time and age". She wrote that over the years critics have commented on each guest editor in the series, and their sometimes "controversial choices", but in this selection, Delgado said "the quality of the writing is never in dispute."

Writing in AudioFile magazine, Leslie B. Fine remarked that the stories in this collection "provides glimpses of worlds, minds, and dreams that are tragic, wistful, disturbing, and thought-provoking." She said that the authors exploit the short form to the fullest, and Fine called their characters "outstanding" in the way they bring each story to life. Kirkus Reviews described the book as "[a] fine celebration of the many guises a short story can take while still doing its essential work". It called Adjei-Brenyah's story,"The Era" the highlight of the collection.

References

2019 anthologies
Fiction anthologies
Short Stories 2019
Houghton Mifflin books